Linda Obenewaa Akweley Ocloo is a Ghanaian politician and member of the Seventh Parliament of the Fourth Republic of Ghana representing the Shai-Osudoku Constituency in the Greater Accra Region on the ticket of the National Democratic Congress.

Education 
In the year 2000, Linda had her Diploma in Banking from the Cambridge Academy in Accra and Business Administration (BA) from the University of Cape Coast, Ghana. She holds a diploma in Insurance which she attained from the National Insurance College at Airport Accra in the year 2004.

Career 
Linda Obenewaa Akweley Ocloo is an Economist, Banker and an Insurer by profession. She served as a Client Service Consultant at Old Mutual Assurance, formerly Provident Life Insurance.

Personal life 
Ocloo is widowed and has five children. Her husband, Desmond William Ocloo, was the original NDC parliamentary candidate for the Shai-Osudoku constituency but died prior to the election following a road traffic collision in May 2016. The party then chose her to stand in place of her husband and she won with a majority of 13,596 votes. She is a Christian ( Mission of God Church, Dodowa)

References

Ghanaian MPs 2017–2021
1979 births
Living people
National Democratic Congress (Ghana) politicians
Ghanaian MPs 2021–2025